Joanne M. Duren (born October 11, 1931) is a former American politician and businesswoman.

Born in Cazenovia, Wisconsin, Duren graduated from Cazenovia High School. In 1950, she graduated from Madison Business College. Duren owned a secretarial service and was secretary for business people and public officials. Duren served as a Democrat in the Wisconsin State Assembly from 1971 to 1983. During the 1983 and 1985 sessions, Duren was the Wisconsin Assembly Chief Clerk.

Notes

1931 births
Living people
People from Cazenovia, Wisconsin
Madison Business College alumni
Businesspeople from Wisconsin
Employees of the Wisconsin Legislature
Women state legislators in Wisconsin
21st-century American women
Democratic Party members of the Wisconsin State Assembly